Khed taluka is a taluka in the subdivision, near Pune city in Pune district of the state of Maharashtra in India. Rajgurunagar is the headquarter of the taluka. The taluka is known for being the birthplace of Santaji Jagnade.The name of city is rajgurunagar on the name of Shaheed Shivram Hari Rajguru.

Demographics
In the 2001 India census, Khed Taluka had a population of 343,214, with 178,114	males (51.9%), and 165,100 females (48.1%), for a sex-ratio of 927 females per thousand males.

See also
 Amboli, Pune
 Talukas in Pune district
 Rajgurunagar (Khed)
 Bhimashankar Temple

References

External links
 

Talukas in Pune district
Talukas in Maharashtra